Englefield is an English surname. Notable people with this surname include the following:

 Cicely Englefield (1893–1970), English artist and author 
 Sir Francis Englefield (c. 1520–1596), English Roman Catholic politician
 Frank Englefield (1878–1945), English footballer
 Sir Henry Charles Englefield, Bt (1752–1822), English antiquary and scientist
 Jarrod Englefield (born 1979), New Zealand cricketer
 Ronald Englefield (1891–1975), English poet and philosopher
 Sir Thomas Englefield (c.1455–1514), Speaker of the House of Commons, England
 Englefield baronets

English-language surnames